Terakki-i Muhadderat (Ottoman Turkish: Progress of Muslim Women) was a weekly women's magazine which was published in the period 1869–1870 in Constantinople, Ottoman Empire. It was the first Ottoman publication which specifically targeted women.

History and profile
Launched in 1869 Terakki-i Muhadderat was the first women's magazine in the Ottoman Empire. The magazine was a weekly supplement of Terakki (Ottoman Turkish: Progress) newspaper published on Sundays. The first issue of the magazine appeared on 27 June 1869.

The only editor of the magazine was Ali Raşit. Terakki-i Muhadderat mostly published the letters from women living in Constantinople. It also featured articles written by women dealing with education, Islam, polygamy and the daily problems of discrimination against themselves. The magazine ceased publication in 1870 after producing a total of forty-eight issues.

References

1869 establishments in the Ottoman Empire
1870 disestablishments in the Ottoman Empire
Defunct magazines published in Turkey
Magazines established in 1869
Magazines disestablished in 1870
Magazines published in Istanbul
Newspaper supplements
Turkish-language magazines
Weekly magazines published in Turkey
Women's magazines published in Turkey